Prakash Narain Tripathi is an Indian politician from Samajwadi Party. He was elected as a member of 10th Lok Sabha from Banda on Bharatiya Janata Party ticket. He joined Indian National Congress in 2004 then Samajwadi Party in 2009

References

1936 births
Year of death missing
India MPs 1991–1996
Samajwadi Party politicians
Indian National Congress politicians from Uttar Pradesh
Bharatiya Janata Party politicians from Uttar Pradesh
People from Banda district, India
Lok Sabha members from Uttar Pradesh